The 1983 Tel Aviv Open was a men's tennis tournament played on outdoor hard courts that was part of the 1983 Volvo Grand Prix. It was played at the Israel Tennis Centers in the Tel Aviv District city of Ramat HaSharon, Israel and was held from October 10 to October 15, 1983. It was the fourth edition of the tournament. Unseeded Aaron Krickstein won the singles title to become the youngest ever player to win a singles ATP title.

Finals

Singles

 Aaron Krickstein defeated  Christoph Zipf 7–6, 6–3 
 It was Krickstein's only title of the year and the 1st of his career.

Doubles

 Colin Dowdeswell /  Zoltán Kuhárszky defeated  Peter Elter /  Peter Feigl 6–4, 7–5
 It was Dowdeswell's only title of the year and the 9th of his career. It was Kuharszky's only title of the year and the 2nd of his career.

References

External links
 ITF tournament editions details

 
Tel Aviv Open
Tel Aviv Open
Tel Aviv Open